Rachel Isadora (born 1953) is an American illustrator, children's book author, specializing in picture books, and painter. She is most famous for the book Ben's Trumpet, runner-up for the 1980 Caldecott Medal, or Caldecott Honor Book, and winner of the Boston Globe-Horn Book honor. Ben's Trumpet was adapted to video and also translated into a ballet by the Boston ballet company BalletRox in 2009. The more than 150 children's books Isadora has written and illustrated span a wide variety of topics, including ballet and dance, American urban culture and family life, life in Africa, and traditional fairy tales. Several of Isadora’s books have been selected by Dolly Parton’s Imagination Library. Isadora was a professional ballet dancer before an injury led to a change of careers. In addition to freelance writing and illustration, Isadora shows and sells oil paintings, many of which reflect her love of dance, as well as her experiences living in Africa and New York City.

Biography
Isadora started dancing as a young girl and went on to study at the School of American Ballet on a scholarship from the Ford Foundation. She studied under New York City Ballet founder and artistic director, George Balanchine, and costume and scenic designer, Rouben Ter-Arutunion. She briefly danced with the Boston Ballet Company, until a foot injury caused her to seek work as a visual artist instead. Her first book published in 1976, Max, is about a boy who realizes that taking ballet can help him become a better baseball player. Max was named an ALA Notable Book. Many of her other works incorporate ballet and dance, most notably the series, Lili at Ballet, Lili on Stage, Lili Backstage, and the Caldecott Honor award-winning Ben's Trumpet, which combines music and dance.

She lived in Africa for almost ten years, and has adapted a number of well-known stories and fairy tales to African settings, including Rapunzel, The Princess and the Pea, Hanzel and Gretel, The Fisherman and His Wife, The Twelve Dancing Princesses, The Night before Christmas, and The Twelve Days of Christmas.

Isadora's love for visual arts continues as well through her oil paintings. Her solo exhibit in 2016 called "Art of the Dance" featured 25 paintings about classic ballet and modern dance. She has continued to exhibit in multiple shows; in 2019 at ArtNY, The Reveal Art Show in Saratoga Springs, NY and ArtMiami.

Works

Writer and illustrator
Max, Macmillan (New York, NY), 1976
The Potters' Kitchen, Greenwillow (New York, NY), 1977
Willaby, Macmillan (New York, NY), 1977
Backstage, with Robert Maiorano, Greenwillow (New York, NY), 1978
Ben's Trumpet, Greenwillow (New York, NY), 1979
My Ballet Class, Greenwillow (New York, NY), 1980
No, Agatha!, Greenwillow (New York, NY), 1980
Jesse and Abe, Greenwillow (New York, NY), 1981
The Nutcracker, (Retold) Macmillan (New York, NY), 1981
City Seen from A to Z, Greenwillow (New York, NY), 1983
Opening Night, Greenwillow (New York, NY), 1984
I Hear, Greenwillow (New York, NY), 1985
I See, Greenwillow (New York, NY), 1985
I Touch, Greenwillow (New York, NY), 1985
The Pirates of Bedford Street, Greenwillow (New York, NY), 1988
The Princess and the Frog (based on The Frog King and Iron Heinrich by Wilhelm and Jacob Grimm), Greenwillow (New York, NY), 1989
Swan Lake: A Ballet Story (based on the ballet Swan Lake by Pyotr Ilich Tchaikovsky), Putnam (New York, NY), 1989
Friends, Greenwillow (New York, NY), 1990
Babies, Greenwillow (New York, NY), 1990
At the Crossroads, Greenwillow (New York, NY), 1991
Over the Green Hills, Greenwillow (New York, NY), 1992
Lili at Ballet, Greenwillow (New York, NY), 1993
Firebird (based on the ballet by Stravinsky), Putnam (New York, NY), 1994
My Ballet Diary, Penguin Putnam (New York, NY), 1995
Lili on Stage, Penguin Putnam (New York, NY), 1995
The Steadfast Tin Soldier (based on the story by Hans Christian Andersen), Penguin Putnam (New York, NY), 1996
The Little Match Girl (based on the story by Hans Christian Andersen), Penguin Putnam (New York, NY), 1996
Lili Backstage, Penguin Putnam (New York, NY), 1997
Young Mozart, Penguin (New York, NY), 1997.
The Little Mermaid (based on the story by Hans Christian Andersen), Penguin Putnam (New York, NY), 1998.
Isadora Dances, Viking Penguin (New York, NY), 1998
A South African Night, HarperCollins (New York, NY), 1998
Caribbean Dreams, Putnam (New York, NY), 1998
Listen to the City, Putnam (New York, NY), 1999
ABC Pop!, Viking Penguin (New York, NY), 1999
Sophie Skates, Penguin Putnam (New York, NY), 1999
123 Pop!, Penguin Putnam (New York, NY), 2000
Nick Plays Baseball, Penguin Putnam (New York, NY), 2001
Bring on That Beat, Penguin Putnam (New York, NY), 2002
Peekaboo Morning, Penguin Putnam (New York, NY), 2002
Mr. Moon, Greenwillow (New York, NY), 2002
On Your Toes: A Ballet ABC, Greenwillow (New York, NY), 2003
Not Just Tutus, Putnam (New York, NY), 2003
In the Beginning, Putnam (New York, NY), 2003
What a Family, Putnam (New York, NY), 2005
Luke Goes to Bat, Putnam (New York, NY), 2005
Yo, Jo!, Harcourt (Orlando, FL), 2007
The Princess and the Pea (based on the story by the Brothers Grimm), Putnam Juvenile (2007)
Rapunzel, (based on the story by the Brothers Grimm), Putnam Juvenile (2008)
The Fisherman and His Wife, (based on the story by the Brothers Grimm), Putnam Juvenile (2008)
The Twelve Dancing Princesses (based on the story by the Brothers Grimm), Putnam Juvenile (2008)
Hanzel and Gretel (based on the story by the Brothers Grimm), Putnam Juvenile (2009)
The Night before Christmas, Putnam Juvenile (2009)
The Twelve Days of Christmas, Putnam Juvenile (2010)
Say Hello, Putnam Juvenile, (2010)
There Was a Tree (adapted from the folk song "And the Green Grass Grew All Around"), Nancy Paulsen Books, Division of Penguin Random House, (2012)
Bea at the Ballet, Nancy Paulsen Books, Division of Penguin Random House (2012)
Old Mikamba Had a Farm, Nancy Paulsen Books, Division of Penguin Random House, (2013)
Jake at Gymnastics, Nancy Paulsen Books, Division of Penguin Random House, (2014)
Bea in the Nutcracker, Nancy Paulsen Books, Division of Penguin Random House, (2015)
I Hear a Pickle, Nancy Paulsen Books, Division of Penguin Random House, (2016)
I Just Want to Say Goodnight, Nancy Paulsen Books, Division of Penguin Random House, (Pub Date, Fall, 2016)
My Dog Laughs, Nancy Paulsen Books, Division of Penguin Random House, (Pub Date, Spring, 2017)

Illustrator
 Robert Maiorano, Francisco, Macmillan (New York, NY), 1978
 Elizabeth Shub, Seeing Is Believing, Greenwillow (New York, NY), 1979
 Robert Maiorano, A Little Interlude, Coward, McCann & Geoghegan (New York, NY), 1980
 Elizabeth Shub, The White Stallion, Greenwillow (New York, NY), 1982
 Elizabeth Shub, Cutlass in the Snow, Greenwillow (New York, NY), 1986
 Patricia C. McKissack, Flossie & the Fox, Dial (New York, NY), 1986
 Ruth Young, Golden Bear, Viking (New York, NY), 1990
 Sandol Stoddard, editor, Prayers, Praises, and Thanksgivings, Dial (New York, NY), 1992
 Reeve Lindbergh, Grandfather's Lovesong, Viking (New York, NY), 1993
 Jane Kurtz, In the Small, Small Night, Greenwillow (New York, NY), 2005
 Deborah Hopkinson, Saving Strawberry Farm, Greenwillow (New York, NY), 2005
 Carolyn Vaughan, "Invitation to Ballet: A Celebration of Dance and Degas", The Metropolitan Museum of Art, Abrams Books (2012)

Painter

To view Isadora’s paintings, refer to this link to her Official website, rachelisadora.com.

Awards and honors
  Max received the 1976 Child Study Association Children's Book of the Year award; Children's Choice award, International Reading Association/Children's Book Council (CBC), 1976; Children's Book Showcase award, CBC, 1977; American Library Association (ALA) notable book citation, and was designated a Reading Rainbow selection
 1979 ALA Notable Book citation, for Seeing Is Believing, written by Elizabeth Shub
 Ben's Trumpet received a Boston Globe/Horn Book honor book for illustration citation in 1979; Best Book for Spring designation, School Library Journal, 1979; and the Caldecott Honor Book award, 1980
 1982 Best Book award, School Library Journal, and ALA notable book citation for The White Stallion, by Elizabeth Shub
 1982  Children's Book award, New York Public Library, for City Seen from A to Z
 1985 Child Study Association Children's Book of the Year award for I Hear and I See
 1986 Child Study Association Children's Book of the Year awards for Flossie and the Fox, by Patricia C. McKissack (which also received a 1987 Horn Book honor list citation) and Cutlass in the Snow, by Elizabeth Shub
 1991 ALA Notable Book citation for At the Crossroads
 2008 Parent's Choice award for "The Fisherman and His Wife"
 2011 Virginia Reader's Choice award for "Hansel and Gretel"
 2012 Horn Book award for "Bea at Ballet"
 2013 ALA Notable Book award for "Old Mikamba Had a Farm"
 2013 100 top Children's Books of the Last 100 Years - New York Public Library includes "Ben's Trumpet"
 2015 Kirkus Review - 3 Star Reviews for "I Hear a Pickle"
 2016 School Library Journal, Amazon Featured Best Book of Month for January - "I Hear a Pickle"

Legacy
Ben's Trumpet was adapted into a jazz ballet choreographed by Tony Williams and debuted by BalletRox in 2009.

References

External links
 
 

1953 births
American children's book illustrators
American children's writers
Writers from New York (state)
Artists from New York (state)
Living people
Date of birth missing (living people)
Place of birth missing (living people)